Aequorlitornithes is a clade of waterbirds recovered in a comprehensive genomic systematic study using nearly 200 species in 2015. It contains the clades Charadriiformes (waders and shorebirds), Mirandornithes (flamingos and grebes) and Phaethoquornithes (Eurypygimorphae and Aequornithes). Previous studies have found different placement for the clades in the tree.

References

Neognathae